Gilbert John Heathcote, 1st Baron Aveland (16 January 1795 – 6 September 1867), known as Sir Gilbert John Heathcote, 5th Baronet from 1851 to 1856, of Stocken Hall, Rutland, was a British peer and Whig politician.

Background
Born at Normanton Hall, he was the eldest son of Sir Gilbert Heathcote, 4th Baronet and his first wife Katherine Sophia Manners, fourth daughter of John Manners. Heathcote was educated at Westminster School and Trinity College, Cambridge. In 1851, he succeeded his father as baronet and to his large estates in Rutland.

Career
In 1820 he was elected to Parliament for Boston, a seat he held until 1830, and again from 1831 to 1832. He later represented Lincolnshire South from 1832 to 1841 and Rutland from 1841 to 1856. Olney describes him as "lukewarm in politics", with the "South Lincolnshire Liberals [finding] it hard to do anything with him, but equally hard to act without him." In 1856 Heathcote was raised to the peerage as Baron Aveland, of Aveland in the County of Lincoln. Having been previously a Deputy Lieutenant for Lancashire and Rutland, he later served as Lord Lieutenant of Lincolnshire from 1862 to 1867. As Lord Lieutenant his duties included the appointment, from advised candidates, of county magistrates, in which he was considered socially conservative being reluctant to appoint those not considered of suitable social standing, however respectable. In 1866 he expressed opposition to the 1867–passed Reform Act designed to widen franchise. Heathcote was appointed honorary colonel of the South Lincoln Militia in 1857.

Family
He married Clementina Drummond-Willoughby, 24th Baroness Willoughby de Eresby, eldest daughter of Peter Drummond-Burrell, 22nd Baron Willoughby de Eresby, in 1827. Heathcote died in September 1867, aged 72, and was succeeded by his son Gilbert Henry Heathcote-Drummond-Willoughby, who later also succeeded his mother in the barony of Willoughby de Eresby in 1888 and was created Earl of Ancaster in 1892.

References

Further reading 
Kidd, Charles, Williamson, David (editors). Debrett's Peerage and Baronetage (1990 edition). New York: St Martin's Press, 1990,

External links 
 

Aveland, Gilbert John Heathcote, 1st Baron
Aveland, Gilbert John Heathcote, 1st Baron
People educated at Westminster School, London
Alumni of Trinity College, Cambridge
Aveland, Gilbert John Heathcote, 1st Baron
Deputy Lieutenants of Lancashire
Deputy Lieutenants of Rutland
Gilbert John
Aveland, Gilbert John Heathcote, 1st Baron
Members of the Parliament of the United Kingdom for English constituencies
UK MPs 1820–1826
UK MPs 1826–1830
UK MPs 1831–1832
UK MPs 1832–1835
UK MPs 1835–1837
UK MPs 1837–1841
UK MPs 1841–1847
UK MPs 1847–1852
UK MPs 1852–1857
UK MPs who were granted peerages
Whig (British political party) MPs for English constituencies
Peers of the United Kingdom created by Queen Victoria